Khachatur Malumian, also known as Edgar Aknuni (Aknouni or Agnouni) (1863  in Meghri, Russian Empire – 1915) was an  Armenian journalist and political activist.

Biography 
Khachatur Malumian gained his early education at the Nersisyan School in Tiflis. He studied at Geneva University, where he became one of the close friends of Christapor Mikaelian, contributing to his Droshak Journal. In 1907 in Vienna, he was delegated to the ARF IV Conference, then in Paris he organized the General Meeting of opposite Ottoman parties for the reinstatement of the Ottoman Constitution. He welcomed the Young Turk movement and worked in Constantinople (now Istanbul) after 1914.

Even when the Ottoman Interior Ministry ordered that the Armenian intellectuals be deported,  Aknuni stayed loyal to Talaat, the Interior Minister, saying, "It’s impossible! Talaat probably doesn’t know about it!"

Malumian was a victim of the Armenian genocide.

Sources
The Armenian Question, encyclopedia, Ed. by acad. K. Khudaverdyan, Yerevan, 1996, p. 26.
Armenia: The Survival of a Nation

References

External link

1863 births
Armenian politicians
1915 deaths
Armenians from the Ottoman Empire
People who died in the Armenian genocide
People from Meghri